Delano Peak is a mountain in the Tushar Mountains in the Fishlake National Forest in Beaver and Piute counties in Utah, United States.

Description
The peak is the highest point in the Tushar Mountains and in both Beaver and Piute counties. The Tushar Mountains are the third-highest range in the state, after the Uinta Mountains and the La Sal Range, though Delano Peak itself is surpassed in height by at least thirty-one other Utah peaks. The mountain is named for Columbus Delano (1809–1896), Secretary of the Interior during the Grant administration. Delano Peak is located just east of Beaver, and can be seen clearly from Interstate 70 and Interstate 15.

See also

 List of mountains in Utah

References

External links

Mountains of Utah
Fishlake National Forest
Mountains of Beaver County, Utah
Mountains of Piute County, Utah